Union Township is one of fifteen townships in DeKalb County, Indiana. As of the 2010 census, its population was 13,220 and it contained 5,886 housing units.

History
Union Township was organized in 1837.

Geography

Cities and towns
 Auburn (northeast three-quarters)

Adjacent townships
 Grant Township (north)
 Concord Township (east)
 Wilmington Township (east)
 Jackson Township (south)
 Keyser Township (west)
 Richland Township (west)

Major highways
  Interstate 69
  State Road 8
  State Road 427

Cemeteries
The township contains seven cemeteries: Cosper, Catholic, Evergreen, Mott, Old Auburn, Roselawn and Woodlawn.

References
 United States Census Bureau cartographic boundary files
 U.S. Board on Geographic Names

External links

 Indiana Township Association
 United Township Association of Indiana

Townships in DeKalb County, Indiana
Townships in Indiana
1837 establishments in the United States
Populated places established in 1837